South Minahasa Regency is a regency in North Sulawesi, Indonesia. Its capital is Amurang. It covers an area of 1,456.46 km2, and had a population of 195,553 at the 2010 Census; this had risen to 236,463 at the 2020 Census. It was originally part of the Minahasa Regency until it was established as a separate regency on 25 February 2003. In turn, a Southeast Minahasa Regency was established as a separate regency from part of the South Minahasa Regency on 2 January 2007.

Administration 
The regency is divided into seventeen districts (kecamatan), tabulated below with their areas and population totals from the 2010 Census and the 2020 Census. The table also includes the location of the administrative centre and the number of administrative villages (rural desa and urban kelurahan) in each district, and its postal codes.

Notes: (a) including 4 small offshore islands.

Climate
Amurang, the seat of the regency has a tropical rainforest climate (Af) with moderate rainfall from July to September and heavy rainfall in the remaining months.

References

Regencies of North Sulawesi